Glen Lochay is in Perthshire, Scotland through which the River Lochay runs eastward towards Loch Tay, joining the River Dochart at Killin.

A road runs up the glen as far as Kenknock Farm (at ), but there is no vehicular access beyond this point. A track leads further up the glen past cottages at Badour, then Batavaime farm (at ), the last occupied building in Glen Lochay. The ruins of cottages can be seen higher up the glen, but these were vacated long ago.

The route of a  walk through this "delightful and remote glen" is documented.

There is an extensive local hydroelectric network throughout this area, much of which is buried under the ground and goes largely unseen, but some pipelines are visible crossing the glen.

Gallery

External links
 The Killin Web Site

References

Lochay
Valleys of Stirling (council area)